Madeira blueberry or Uva-de-serra (Vaccinium padifolium ) is very common at elevations between . It grows mainly in crevices and exposed slopes and mountain plains. Fruits are used in preserves. It is endemic to the islands of Madeira and Porto Santo, Portugal.

Description
It is a semi-evergreen scrub to small tree 1.5–6 m tall. New branches are generally reddish and pubescent. Leaves are often flushed dark red in autumn 2.5–7 × 1–2(2.5) cm, oblong to elliptic, acute to acuminate, petiole short, pubescent. Calyx 3–4 mm, with five short, broad lobes up to 1.5 mm. Flowers on curved pedicels in erect, axillary, bracteate racemes.  Corolla, 7–10 mm, globose to campanulate, the lobes very short. There are often five broad rose stripes on the white corolla. Berries up to 12 × 10 mm,  ripening blue-black.

Chemistry
The blue color of the berries is due to anthocyanins (Delphinidin 3-O-α-rhamnoside and anthocyanins triglycosides).

Picture gallery

References

 Flora Endémica da Madeira, Roberto Jardim, David Francisco, Múchia, Publicações, 1ªed, 2000, Portugal, 
 J. R. Press and M. J. Short, Flora of Madeira, 2001, Natural History Museum, UK,

padifolium
Endemic flora of Madeira